The Paštrovići is a historical tribe and region in the Montenegrin Littoral. Paštrovići stretches from the southernmost part of the Bay of Kotor, from the cape of Zavala to Spič. Its historical capital was the island of Sveti Stefan. From 1423 until 1797, with interruptions by the Ottoman Empire. It was part of the Kingdom of Dalmatia from 1815 to 1918, then Yugoslavia, then became part of Montenegro only after World War II. It is historically one of two major "maritime tribes", the other being Grbalj.

Etymology
The etymology of the name Paštrovići is unclear. Vukmanović says that the name Paštrović could have been derived from the word pastro, a name which still exists in modern Albanian, being derived from pastër, meaning "clean" in Albanian. Another theory proposes that the name could be related to the Vlach word pastor or paštor, meaning “shepherd” in Latin. Kaser suggests a possible derivation from Slavic pastiri.

History
  
Mayhew and Calić considers them to have been an Albanian tribe, while according to Ćirković, the Paštrovići were Vlachs who had until the middle of the 14th century, been culturally and linguistically Slavicized, a thesis supported by Kaser.

The name is first attested in a text dating to 1355, regarding nobleman Nikolica Paštrović in the service of Serbian emperor Stefan Dušan (r. 1331–55), sent to the Republic of Ragusa. In 1363, Radak Paštrović donated to a church in Rac. Since 1377 they are regularly mentioned in Ragusan documents. In March 1399, several "people from Paštrovići" are mentioned.

During the First Scutari War (1405–13) they were under control of the related Đurašević family whose members held the most prestigious positions on the court of Balša III.

The personal name Pastri can also be found in the 1416-17 Scutari land register, with Visha wife of the late Pastri Kukoli being mentioned in the village of Luorsi. The village had predominantly Albanian anthroponomy, with names such as Tanush, Bardh, Midhë or Kruet.

In the Second Scutari War (1419–23) they at first served the Serbian Despotate, until January 1423 when the Republic of Venice managed to bribe them and other tribes in the region over to the Venetian side. Though none of these were mobilized militarily, they left the Serbian ranks and thus became potential danger to Despot Stefan Lazarević. The Paštrović assembly agreed to enter the service of Venice in April 1423, accepting Venetian suzerainty and taxes; in return they received promise to respect their tribal institution, guarantees of their present lands and recognition of their right to lost lands.  Peace was signed in August 1423.
Thus, by this 1423 treaty, the province of Paštrovići received an autonomous status, while the brotherhoods (families) of Paštrovići became a "tribe", building their free villager estate and internal self-government with kinship organization – becoming petty nobility.

In the Bosnian-Ragusan war for the lands of Konavle, the Ragusan republic hired 200 Albanian mercenaries from Paštrovići (ex Albanensibus de loco Pastrouichi), who along with soldiers from other regions where contracted for a period of 2 months, and were paid 5 perpero per man.
In 1445, Venetian supporters in Paštrovići killed a cousin in a blood feud. Afterwards an oath of besa was taken, being soon broken with two people from the murderer’s family being killed. The Venetian administration provided for the victims' families however they did not interfere directly, allowing the Paštrovići to regulate their personal matters in accordance with the Kanun, this being allowed through the legal privileges granted by Venice. The Paštrovići were permitted to use local judicial assemblies for settling and resolving any disputes. Among the leaders of the medieval Paštrovići, a certain comes Progonus is mentioned, Progon being a common Albanian anthroponym.

In the 1582–83 Ottoman defter (tax registry) of the Montenegro Vilayet, an autonomous province of the Sanjak of Scutari, Paštrovići was one of nine nahiya, with 36 villages (out of a total of 148 in the vilayet). In 1592–93, Derviš-beg Alić Sarvanović, the sanjak-bey of Montenegro, also held Paštrovići and Perast. After the battle of Kotor 1657, Governor General Antonio Bernardo continued to support tribe of Paštrovići.

In 16th and 17th century documents, the surname Paštar is found, ie Pastar, which likely refers to the old Paštrović brotherhood. In 1571, the judge Rado Paštar is mentioned, and in 1609 Kristina, daughter of Nikola Pastra, who converted to the Catholic faith. In two places in Glamočko Polje, in Zajaruza and Čukura, live two families of the Pashtra brotherhood.

Paštrovići were the part of Republic of Venice until the fall of Venice in 1797.

Culture
Paštrovići is traditionally Orthodox Christian. In these areas there are six Serbian Orthodox monasteries and among them, Gradište monastery.

People from Paštrovići were oriented towards maritime trade and they had a great number of captains and shipowners. Majority of the population were dealing with agriculture and 
livestock breeding, while in the littoral salination was developed very well.

Anthropology

Families
Paštar, Novaković, Bečići, Čučuci, Gracuni, Klapavice, Kalođurđevići, Dabkovići, Kuljače, Kentere, Kažanegre, Balići, Mitrovići, Grlomani, Anđusi (also known as Angius in America), Despotovići, Đuraševići, Sankovići, Jovanovići, Rađenovići, Luketići, Vojnići, Rafailovići, Markićevići, Divanovići, Goliši, Ljubiše, Niklanovići, Krute, Radovići, Vujakovići, Vukovići, Sklenderi, Pavlovići, Kaloštrovići, Đedovići, Đakonovići, Zenovići, Perazići, Bosnići, Franovići, Franićevići, Srzentići, Davidovići, Mikovići, Medigovići, Gregovići, Androvići, Radenovići, Šoljage, Vukotići, Suđići, Andrići, Midžori, Todorice, Armenci, Medini, Milutinovići, Draškovići, Živkovići, Perovići, Mainići, Vukmirovići, Bogovići.

Notable people
 
Stefan Štiljanović, Hungarian nobleman, proclaimed Serbian saint
Stefan Paštrović, 16th-century publisher of the earliest Serbian primer
Stefano Zannowich, Serbian writer and adventurer
Stjepan Mitrov Ljubiša, a writer
Visarion Ljubiša, Metropolitan of Montenegro
Rade Andrović, a national hero
Borko Paštrović, Serbian Chetnik commander during the First Balkan War
Marin Beçikemi, Albanian humanist and writer from Shkodër

References

Sources

External links 
Paštrovići homepage

Budva Municipality
Bar Municipality
Tribes of Montenegro